Up a Tree is the debut studio album by Looper, released in 1999. It peaked at number 23 on the UK Independent Albums Chart, as well as number 79 on the Scottish Albums Chart.

The album was recorded shortly after Looper had recruited two new members, Ronnie Black and Scott Twynholm.

Track listing

Charts

References

External links
 

1999 debut albums
Looper (band) albums
Jeepster Records albums
Sub Pop albums